Alekos is a masculine given name, a diminutive of Alexander, which may refer to:

Alekos Alavanos (born 1950), Greek politician, member of the Hellenic Parliament
Alekos Alekou (born 1983), Cypriot football striker who played for Aris Limassol
Alekos Alexandrakis (1928–2005), famous Greek actor
Alekos Alexiadis (born 1945), Greek footballer
Alekos Fassianos (born 1935), renowned Greek painter
Alekos Flambouraris (born 1938), Greek politician
Alekos Karavitis (1904–1975), born in Aktounta, a small village in the region of Aghios Vasileios in Crete
Alekos Livaditis (1914–1980), Greek actor
Alekos Michaelides (1933–2008), Cypriot politician
Alekos Petroulas (born 1978), Greek basketball player
Alekos Rantos (born 1966), Greek footballer and coach
Alekos Sakellarios (1913–1991), Greek writer and a director
Alekos Sofianidis (born 1933), former Turkish-Greek football player and manager
Alexandros Panagoulis (1939–1976), Greek politician and poet
Alekos Zartaloudis (1929–2007), Greek actor

See also
Aleko (given name)

Greek masculine given names